Bashkin is a Russian surname. Notable people with the surname include:

Matvei Bashkin (fl. 16th century), Russian boyar's son charged with heresy
Pavel Bashkin (born 1978), Russian handball player

Russian-language surnames